The Taman Equine MRT station (Working name: Equine Park) is a mass rapid transit (MRT) station that will serve the suburbs of Taman Equine and Taman Pinggiran Putra in Selangor, Malaysia. It is one of the stations being built as part of the Klang Valley Mass Rapid Transit (KVMRT) project on the Putrajaya Line.

Location 
The station is located on Jalan Seri Kembangan near Pasar Borong Selangor and AEON Mall Equine Park, both accessible with walking distance from the station.

Bus Services

Feeder buses

Other buses

References

External links
 Equine Park MRT Station | mrt.com.my
 Klang Valley Mass Rapid Transit
 MRT Hawk-Eye View

Rapid transit stations in Selangor
Sungai Buloh-Serdang-Putrajaya Line